Mohamed Abdou Madi is a Comorian politician who served as Prime Minister of Comoros from 2 January 1994 to 14 October 1994. He was appointed by Said Mohamed Djohar.

Career 
In 1994 he became Prime Minister and later became Justice minister in 1998. In 14 October 1994, Said Mohamed Djohar dismissed him as Prime minister of Comoros and appointed Halifa Houmadi.

References 

Living people
Prime Ministers of the Comoros
Year of birth missing (living people)